This list of cemeteries in Massachusetts includes currently operating, historical (closed for new interments), and defunct (graves abandoned or removed) cemeteries, columbaria, and mausolea which are historical and/or notable. It does not include pet cemeteries.

Berkshire County 
 Beth Israel Cemetery, North Adams 
 Center Cemetery, Stockbridge

Bristol County 
 Assonet Burying Ground, Assonet 
 Friends-Central Cemetery, Westport
 Oak Grove Cemetery, Fall River 
 Riverside Cemetery, Fairhaven

Dukes County 
 Chilmark Cemetery, Chilmark

Essex County 
 Burying Point and Witch Trial Victims Memorial, Salem
 Old Burial Hill, Marblehead
 Old Hill Burying Ground, Newburyport
 Old North Parish Burying Ground, North Andover 
 Pine Grove Cemetery, Lynn
 Swampscott Cemetery, Swampscott

Franklin County 
 Deerfield Cemetery, Deerfield
 Green River Cemetery, Greenfield
 Hill Cemetery (historic), Shelburne
 Arms Cemetery, Shelburne
 South Cemetery, Shelburne
 East Cemetery, Shelburne
 Center Cemetery, Shelburne
 Hawks Cemetery, Shelburne

Hampden County 
 Bay Path Cemetery, Springfield 
 Springfield Cemetery, Springfield

Hampshire County 
 Knights Cemetery, Pelham
 Quabbin Park Cemetery, Quabbin Valley
 West Cemetery, Amherst

Middlesex County 
 Belmont Cemetery, Belmont
 Cambridge Cemetery, Cambridge
 Edson Cemetery, Lowell 
 Forestvale Cemetery, Hudson
 Lowell Cemetery, Lowell (1840s)
 Mount Auburn Cemetery, Cambridge - List of burials at Mount Auburn Cemetery
 Newton Cemetery, Newton
 Salem Street Burying Ground, Medford (late 17th century)
 Sleepy Hollow Cemetery, Concord
 Spring Hill Cemetery, Marlborough
St. Michael Cemetery, Hudson
 Wildwood Cemetery, Winchester

Nantucket County 
 Founders Burial Ground, Nantucket
 Prospect Hill Cemetery, Nantucket

Norfolk County 
 Holyhood Cemetery, Brookline
 Walnut Hills Cemetery, Brookline
 Brookdale Cemetery, Dedham
 Old Village Cemetery, Dedham
 Baby Cemetery, Dedham
 Sharon Memorial Park, Sharon

Plymouth County 
 Burial Hill, Plymouth
 Old Ship Church Cemetery, Hingham

Suffolk County 

 Granary Burying Ground, Boston (17th century) 
 Greek Theology School of Boston

Worcester County 
 Evergreen Cemetery, Leominster
 Hillside Cemetery, Shrewsbury
 Hope Cemetery, Worcester
 Quaker Cemetery, Leicester
 Worcester County Memorial Park, Paxton
 Woodlawn Cemetery, Clinton

See also
 List of cemeteries in the United States
 Pioneer cemetery, a type of cemetery

References

Λ
Massachusetts